Lysurus pakistanicus is a species of fungus in the stinkhorn family. Found in Pakistan, it was first described scientifically in 2006 from a specimen collected on the lawn of the campus of the University of the Punjab in Lahore. The fruit bodies features a clathrate (latticelike) netted head atop a short stipe. It has spores measuring 1.75–2.15 by 3.85–5.25 µm.

References

External links

Phallales
Fungi described in 2006
Fungi of Asia